Callipogonius hircinus is a species of beetle in the family Cerambycidae. It was described by Henry Walter Bates in 1885. It is known from Honduras and Mexico.

References

Pogonocherini
Beetles described in 1885